Ahrara is a town in Safi Province, Marrakesh-Safi, Morocco. According to the 2004 census it has a population of 1028.

References

Populated places in Safi Province
Rural communes of Marrakesh-Safi